Scopula drenowskii is a moth of the family Geometridae. It is found in Bulgaria and Turkey.

Taxonomy
The species was previously listed as a synonym of Scopula decorata, but was reinstated as a valid species  by Can in 2009.

References

Moths described in 1941
drenowskii
Moths of Europe
Moths of Asia